Pseudomelittia berlandi is a moth of the family Sesiidae. It is known from Malawi and Tanzania.

References

Sesiidae
Lepidoptera of Malawi
Lepidoptera of Tanzania
Moths of Sub-Saharan Africa